James Gilman or Gillman may refer to:

James K. Gilman, United States Army general
Jim Gilman (James Joseph Gilman, 1870–1912), baseball third baseman
James Gilman (cricketer) (1879–1976), English cricketer
James Gillman, physician who tried to cure Samuel Taylor Coleridge's opium addiction
James Gillman, one of the founders of Wesley College, Sheffield
James Franklin Gilman (1850–1929), artist